The GP-25 Kostyor ("Bonfire"), GP-30 Obuvka ("Footwear") and GP-34 are a family of Russian 40 mm under-barrel grenade launchers (Granatomyot Podstvolnyj) for the AK family of assault rifles. They were first seen by the West in 1984 during the Soviet Invasion of Afghanistan. The GP-30 was lightened and the redesigned sighting system was moved to the right.

The current Izhmash-made version, the GP-34, has a further-redesigned sighting system located to the right side of the weapon and features the following advantages:
 Reliability: It is designed and tested specifically for the Kalashnikov assault rifles, fits such assault rifles directly without any adaptors or forearm dismantling.
 Improved safety: The design prevents a round from moving within or falling out of the barrel, even if the muzzle is pointed down. The GP-34 features an additional mechanism (firing pin safety lever) to improve safety during loading.

Development

Development of a grenade launcher for the AKM assault rifle began in 1966 at the Sporting and Hunting Arms Central Design and Research Bureau. Development continued into the 1970s, and in 1978 it was accepted into service. The GP-30 first entered service in 1989, and is intended for use with the AK-100 series of assault rifles. The GP-34 is designed to be a universal service model that can be fitted to the AKM / AKMS, AK-74 / AKs-74, AK-74M, AK-101, AK-103, and AN-94 rifles.

Description

The grenade launchers are similar in appearance and fire the same 40 mm caliber ammunition and use the same High-Low System developed by Germany in late World War II to keep recoil forces low without a rocket or other type of recoilless weapon back blast.

The GP-30(M) is a stripped-down model grenade launcher, consisting of a very short, 40 mm rifled barrel in front of a basic trigger mechanism with minimal hand grip. On top of the barrel is mounting gear to attach the weapon under the barrel of an AK-series assault rifle, from where it is designed to be fired.

A grenade is first muzzle loaded into the barrel, the weapon is aimed, then the self-cocking trigger is pulled to fire the weapon. This fires the percussion cap at the base of the grenade which triggers the nitrocellulose propellant inside the body of the grenade. The hot expanding gas from the propellant is forced through vents in the base of the grenade that move the grenade along the barrel, and at the same time force the driving band to engage with the twelve rifling grooves. The rifling imparts stabilizing spin to the projectile.

The barrel has a service life of about 400 rounds.

Ammunition
The grenade launchers fire a series of special 40 mm grenades. Originally, the main grenade was the VOG-15 (7P17) fragmentation grenade. This was superseded by the steel-cased VOG-25 fragmentation grenade. The VOG-25 has a lethal radius of six meters. Rounds for the muzzle-loaded GP-25 consist of a single piece containing both propellant and warhead, unlike the more traditional two piece casing-and-projectile design of the comparable American 40x46mm round used in breech-loaded grenade launchers, such as the M203.

A bouncing grenade, the VOG-25P, is also available. On impact, a small charge in the nose of the grenade is detonated; this raises the grenade 0.5 to 1.5 m in the air, before an impact delay fuse detonates it. The VOG-25P also has a lethal radius of six meters.

New generation rounds VOG-M and VOG-PM with an increased effectiveness not less than 1.5 times are now serially available.

Smoke grenades are also available. The original GRD-40 grenade has been replaced by a series of grenades designed for use at different ranges. These are the GRD-50, GRD-100 and GRD-200 for use at 50, 100 and 200 meters respectively. They are capable of producing a 20 cubic meter cloud of smoke that lasts for one minute in winds of up to five meters per second.

A CS gas grenade called the Gvozd ("Nail") and a baton grenade are also available.

Grenades

 Fuse arming range: 10–40 m (33–130 ft)
 Fuse self-destruction time: 14–19 s
 VOG-25 specifications:
 Weight: 250 g (0.55 lb)
 Warhead: 48 g of A-IX-1 explosive.
 VOG-25P specifications:
 Weight: 278 g (0.61 lb)
 Warhead: 37 g of TNT.
 GRD-50/100/200 specifications
 Weight: 265 g
 Warhead: 90 g

Variants
 GP-25 Kostyor 
 GP-30 Obuvka 
 GP-34

Users

 
 
 
 
 : Used by Caatinga infantry
 : Made under license by Arsenal AD as the UBGL and the UBGL-1.
 
 
 
 : Made by STC Delta.
 : Used for the AK-74M.
 
 : Mobile Brigade Corps
  : Used by IRGC
 : Lithuanian Armed Forces
 
 
 
 : Made under license by Zastava Arms as the PBG – 40 mm and the PBG 40 mm M70.
 
 : Uses both GP-25s and GP-30Ms.

See also
 BS-1 Tishina
 QLG-10
 RGM-40 Kastet grenade launcher is a stand-alone version of GP-30 grenade launcher
 Wz. 1974 Pallad grenade launcher

References

External links

 Modern Firearms
 Technical data, instructional images and diagrams of the GP-25 
 Differences between GP-25, GP-30, GP-30M and GP-34 

Grenade launchers of the Soviet Union
Grenade launchers of Russia
Cold War weapons of the Soviet Union
Kalashnikov Concern products
TsKIB SOO products
Caseless firearms
Weapons and ammunition introduced in 1978